Grant Aviation is a regional airline that serves the town of Kenai, the Yukon-Kuskokwim Delta, Bristol Bay, and the Aleutian Chain in Alaska, United States. The airline was formed in 1971 as Delta Air Services based in Emmonak. The current owners are Bruce McGlasson and Mark "Woody" Richardson, who purchased the airline in 2004.  The company slogan is "Fly Easy, Fly Grant."

History 
Grant Aviation was established in 1971 as Delta Air Services in Emmonak. The name was changed to Grant Aviation in 1993. Throughout the company's early years, before organizations like LifeMed Alaska, Grant provided medevac services for many of the villages of the Yukon Kuskokwim Delta. Villages would call Grant for medevac services and Grant would then transport patients to receive emergency medical care.

In October 1994, the village of Emmonak gave a Native owl mask to Grant Aviation in appreciation for numerous life-saving efforts in the villages of the Yukon River Delta. Later this mask became the company logo.

Operations

Grant Aviation serves over 100 communities in Alaska throughout the Yukon-Kuskokwim Delta, the Aleutians and Bristol Bay.with bases in Anchorage, Bethel, Cold Bay, Dillingham, Emmonak, Kenai, King Salmon and Unalaska/Dutch Harbor. IIt provides air ambulance services in the Yukon-Kuskokwim Delta Region through a contract with LifeMed Alaska.

Fleet 

Grant Aviation flies a fleet of small propeller-driven airplanes, including:

On 7 July 2020, Grant Aviation acquired 10 Cessna 208 Caravans, and five Cessna 207 planes at Ravn Alaska's bankruptcy auction.

Community awareness 
Grant Aviation, along with Bering Air, Frontier Flying Service, Northern Air Cargo, PenAir, and Ryan Air, participates in the Flying Can service, which allows rural Alaskan communities to recycle aluminum cans and now number 1 PET bottles in cooperation with Alaskans for Litter Prevention and Recycling. Grant provides air ambulance services in the Yukon-Kuskokwim Delta Region through a contract with LifeMed Alaska. Grant Aviation also has a program to move shelter animals from the Kenai to Anchorage, where they have a better chance of getting adopted.

Quyana Rewards 
Grant Aviation offers a frequent-flyer program called Quyana Rewards. Members get credit for every paid segment on Grant Aviation. Members can redeem a free one-way ticket for every five segments and a round trip for ten segments, anywhere they fly. Rewards never expire.

See also 
Air transportation in the United States
List of airlines of the United States
List of airports in the United States
Transportation in the United States

References

External links
 

1971 establishments in Alaska
Air ambulance services in the United States
Airlines established in 1971
Airlines based in Alaska
American companies established in 1971
Companies based in Alaska
Kusilvak Census Area, Alaska
Regional airlines of the United States
Medical and health organizations based in Alaska